The Rough Guide to African Disco is a world music compilation album originally released in 2013 featuring mainly 1970s and '80s African disco. Part of the World Music Network Rough Guides series, the album contains two discs: an overview of the genre on Disc One, and a "bonus" Disc Two highlighting Cameroonian artist Maloko. Disc One features five South African tracks, four Nigerian, two Ghanaian, and one each from Cameroon and France. The release was compiled by Dominic Raymond-Barker and Phil Stanton, co-founder of the World Music Network.

Critical reception

Gregory Heaney of AllMusic called the album "solid" and praised the World Music Network for increasing the world's funkiness. Robert Christgau rewarded the release with an "A−", saying it succeeded in finding the balance between "cheap commercialism and heartfelt ambition." While "The Dean" waxed poetic on Disc Two, David Maine of PopMatters pronounced it a stab at "accessibility for western ears" fallen flat. He did however call the "Afro-funk" and "Afro-pop" of Disc One worth exploring. Writing for TimeOut, Lydia Jenkin labelled the album "stunning".

Track listing

Disc One

Disc Two
Disc Two is a re-release of Maloko's Soul on Fire.

References

External links
 
 

2013 compilation albums
African Disco